Ilha is a former civil parish in the municipality of Pombal, Portugal.  In 2013, the parish merged into the new parish Guia, Ilha e Mata Mourisca. The population in 2011 was 1,931, in an area of 16.20 km2.

References

Former parishes of Pombal, Portugal
Populated places disestablished in 2013
2013 disestablishments in Portugal